Løjt Kirkeby is a town, with a population of 2,322 (1 January 2022), in Aabenraa Municipality, Region of Southern Denmark in Denmark.

The town is situated on a small peninsula named Løjt Land, 20 km south of Haderslev and 7 km north of Aabenraa.

Løjt Church

Løjt Church, situated in the south part of the town, was likely consecrated to Saint George.

The two chancel vaults are decorated with Late Gothic frescoes.

The Late Gothic altarpiece is Southern Jutlands largest and comprises a middle panel plus two stationary and two moveable panels resting on a predella with sculptures and paintings.

Notable people
 The Danish author Marcus Lauesen (1907-1975) was born in Løjt Kirkeby.

References

Cities and towns in the Region of Southern Denmark